2 Compositions (Ensemble) 1989/1991 is an album featuring ensemble performances of compositions by Anthony Braxton which was recorded in Germany in 1989 and 1991 and released on the HatART label.

Track listing
All compositions by Anthony Braxton.
 "Composition No. 147" – 16:50	
 "Composition No. 151: Part I" – 24:26	
 "Composition No. 151: Part II" – 31:43

Personnel

Track 1
Ensemble Modern Frankfurt conducted by Diego Masson
Soloists: Joachim Klemm, John Corbett, Roland Diry – clarinet
Anne La Berge, Dietmar Wiesner – flute
Catherine Milliken – oboe
Wolfgang Stryi – bass clarinet, saxophone
Veit Scholz – bassoon
Achim Reus, Vanessa King – cor anglais
Julian Brewer, Tony Cross – trumpet
Uwe Dierksen, Norbert Hardegen – trombone
Rainer Römer, Rumi Ogawa-Helferich – percussion
Karin Schmeer – harp
Hermann Kretzschmar, Ueli Wiget – piano
Klaus Obermauer – guitar
Hilary Sturt, Peter Rundel, Sebastian Gottschick, Thomas Hofer – violin
Almut Steinhausen, Werner Dickel – viola
Friedemann Dähn, Michael Stirling – cello
Thomas Fichter – double bass

Tracks 2 & 3
Creative Music Ensemble conducted by Anthony Braxton
Adam Zablocki – flute
 Wolfgang Schubert – cor anglais
Vlatko Kučan – soprano saxophone
Klaus Roemer – alto saxophone
Bernd Reincke – baritone saxophone
Georgia Charlotte Hoppe – bass clarinet
Hermann Süss, Tobias Netta, Tosten Maas – trumpet
Ferdinand v. Seebach, Heinz-Erich Gödecke – trombone
Dizi Fisher  – tuba
Andreas Nock – guitar
Dorothea Geiger, Mauretta Heinzelmann, Nicola Kruse – violin
Mike Rutledge – viola
Cornelia Gottberg, Ralf Werner – cello
Frank Skriptschinsky, Johannes Huth, Peter Niklas Wilson – double bass
"Buggy" Braune – piano
Hans Schüttler – synthesizer
Bernd v. Ostrowski – vibraphone
Dirk Dhonau – marimbaphone
Björn Lücker, Dieter Gostisha, Heinz Lichius – percussion

References

Hathut Records albums
Anthony Braxton albums
1992 albums